Keepers of Youth is a 1932 British drama film directed by Thomas Bentley and starring Garry Marsh, Ann Todd and Robin Irvine. It was based on the 1929 play Keepers of Youth by Arnold Ridley, and marked the film debut of Ann Todd. It was shot at the Elstree Studios of British International Pictures.

Plot
The arrival of Mr. Knox, the new sports instructor at a British public school, heralds trouble. He imposes his dominant personality to influence colleagues and the headmaster alike, and then attempts to force himself on Millicent, the assistant matron.

Cast
Garry Marsh as Knox 
Ann Todd as Millicent 
Robin Irvine as David Lake 
John Turnbull as Gordon Duff 
O. B. Clarence as Slade 
Herbert Ross as Sullivan 
Mary Clare as Mrs Venner 
Ethel Warwick as Matron 
Rene Ray as Kitty Williams

References

External links

1932 films
British drama films
1932 drama films
Films shot at British International Pictures Studios
1930s English-language films
Films directed by Thomas Bentley
British films based on plays
British black-and-white films
1930s British films